Adanalı is a Turkish crime drama TV series that was broadcast by ATV in 2008.

Cast

References 

2008 Turkish television series debuts
2010 Turkish television series endings
Television shows set in Istanbul
Television series produced in Istanbul
Television series set in the 2010s
Turkish crime drama television series